The 2013–14 Luxembourg National Division was the centennial season of top-tier football in Luxembourg. It began on 3 August 2013 and ended on 18 May 2014. Fola Esch were the defending champions having won their sixth league championship in the previous season.

Stadia and locations

League table

Results

Relegation play-offs

Top goalscorers

See also
2013–14 Luxembourg Cup

References

External links

Luxembourg National Division seasons
Lux
1